Banasree is a residential area of Dhaka in Bangladesh which has been developed by Eastern Housing Limited.

Education
 Ideal School and College, Banasree Branch
 National Ideal School, Banasree Branch
 National Ideal English Version School

Health
 Farazi Hospital Ltd.
 Famouse Specialized Hospital

Commercial
 Aarong
 Le Reve
 SaRa
 Artisan

References

Dhaka District
Neighbourhoods in Dhaka